Sri Narayana Teertha (c. 1650 – 1745 CE) was a great saint, devotee of Lord Sri Krishna, the supreme lord, and sang many songs on him.

Brief lifesketch
Sri Narayana Teertha was born in South India in the region covered by the present-day Andhra Pradesh. He lived in Kaza, Guntur district near Mangalagiri. He belonged to Tallavarjula family. His birth name was Govinda Sastrulu. They eventually moved to Thanjavur, Tamil Nadu.

While there is significant dissention as to his exact time, historians place him between 1610 and 1745 AD. An extensive research done with the help of archives preserved in Saraswati Mahal Library has helped place the time closer to 1650 AD – 1745 AD, and he reportedly lived a long life.

He mastered music at a very early age and studied Puranas, Srimad Bhagavatam and other Sanskrit works. He renounced family at a very early age and took on a life of a religious devotion. He went to Varanasi to spread his philosophy.

Teertha was very well versed in Music and, Natya Shastra, and a great scholar in Sanskrit. He used at least 34 popular ragas. He used Triputa, Adi, Rupaka, Chapu, Jampa, Matya, Vilamba, Eka and Ata . Many of the songs are structurally well set for direct use as nritya or natya padams. He carefully avoided complex usages and utilized easy expressions. His Gadyams and Padyams are exquisite in beauty. He used 17 different Chandas or meters such as Anushtup, Arya, Indravajra, Bhujangaprayadam, Shardula vikriditam, Vasanta tilaka, Prithvi.

He wrote 15 books and some of them are available in Benares Hindu University and Parijatapaharanam at Saraswathi Mahal in Tanjore. He is also credited with composing two other operas, Parijaa Apaharanam and Haribhakti Sudharnavam.

Sri Narayana Tirtha received divine blessings at Varagur in Thanjavur District. His mukthi sthalam (place of eternity) is at Varagur. Although he lived in Varahur, Sri Narayana Tirtha attained Siddhi in 1745 at a nearby village called Thirupoonthuruthy under a huge mango tree, on the banks of river Kudamurutti, on the Masi Sukla Ashtami, Guruvaram, Krithika Nakshatram day. It is said that he attained 'Jeeva Samadhi' (even while alive). A small shrine has been constructed on this hallowed spot, under the sprawling mango tree.

Sri Krishna Leela Tarangini

Narayana Teertha was the author of a Sanskrit opera called Sri Krishna Leela Tarangini on the life of the Lord Krishna.  It deals with the various pastimes of Lord Krishna, starting from describing his various avataras, to his birth, childhood pastimes (Bala Leelas) and ending with his marriage to Sri Rukmini.  Narayana Teertha uses various literary and musical forms such as songs, prose passages, slokas (praises in verse), dwipadis (couplets), etc. The songs are popularly called "Tarangas" means waves. The lyrics are simple yet beautiful and effective. The Gita Govinda of Sri Jayadeva Goswami is said to be the inspiration. The Gita Govinda of Jayadeva Goswami, Krishna Karnamritam of Sri Bilvamangalacharya, and the Krishna Leela Tarangini of Sri Narayana Teertha are said to be the 'three gems' in medieval Vaishnava literature describing the Lord's various pastimes and plays.

Legend has it that the inspiration to compose this piece occurred when he was along the banks of Naducauvery. He was suffering from a serious stomach ailment and prayed that he should be given the strength to go back to Tirupati, where it all started. A divine voice asked him to follow a boar (Varaha) to wherever it led him. The Varaha led him to Bhupatirajapuram, which came to be known as `Varagur' (meaning 'Varaha' or boar, and 'Ur' or village) later. The boar which guided Narayana Teertha to Bhupatirajapuram was no ordinary boar, but Lord Varaha (the boar-form of Krishna) himself. The people of the village knew that a great personality was coming, due to many auspicious omens. With their help, he built a beautiful temple for the ancient idols of Sri Lakshmi-Narayana, Navaneetha Krishna and Sri Srinivasa (Venkateshwara) (which were there in the village) and settled down on the banks of river 'Kudamurutty' the name by which the Cauvery was known at this place.

Tarangini is an opera highly suitable for dance drama and it has been very well utilized by Indian classical dancers, especially in Kuchipudi over the last two centuries. Tarangini consists of 12 Tarangams and encapsulates 153 songs, 302  and 31 . Teertha followed Veda VyAsa's Bhagavatam and concentrated on the 10th skandam.

Other works
 Subodhinī – a treatise (in Sanskrit) on Brahma Sutra śaṅkara Bhāṣyam;
 Vivaraṇa Dīpika (in Telugu), a treatise on Panchīkaraṇa vartika of Sureshwarāchārya;
 Pārijātāpaharaṇam, the well known Yakshaganam in Telugu
 Hari Bhakti Sudhārṇavam, and
 Śāṇdilya bhakti sūtra vyākyānam

Popular compositions
Some of the popular compositions are listed here:

 Jaya jaya swāmin jaya jaya 
 Jaya jaya ramā nātha
 Śaraṇaṃ bhava
 Nārāyaṇāya
 Maṅgalālayāya mamava deva
 Jaya jaya durgē jita vairi vargē 
 Bāla gōpāla kṛṣṇa pāhi ! 
 Bāla gōpāla māṃ uddhara ! kṛṣṇa
 Mādhava Māmava deva
 Ehi mudaṃ dehi kṛṣṇa
 Ehi mudaṃ mama
 kṛṣṇaṃ kalaya ! sakhi sundaraṃ
 Kalaya yaśode
 Dāmodara tāvaka
 
 Alokaye śri Bālakṛṣṇaṃ 
 
 Jaya jaya gokulabala jaya sakalagama moola
 Deva deva praseeda
 
 Pahi pahi jagan
 Deva kuru Siksham
 Shree Gopālaka
 Ayahi vraja

 Govardhana
 Nanda nandana
 Parama purusha
 Pūraya mama kāmaṃ
 vada kiṃ karavāṇi
 Mādhava māmava
 Govindaṃ iha 
 Nanda nandana
 Kathaya kathaya 
 Bhavaye
 Vijaya Gopala
 Pahi pahi mam
 Shiva shiva bhava sharanam 
 Vedadri shikhara nṛsimhaṃ
 Vekshe kada devadevam gopalamoortim
 Re re Manasa
 Gopala Meva daivatam 
 Kalyanam bhavatu
 jaya jaya bala gopala
 Alokaye rukmini kalyana gopalam
 jaya mangalam
 Kshemam kuru Gopala
 param karunaya mam palaya

Aradhana
Sri Narayana Teertha Trust of Kaja, at the birthplace of Saint Narayana Teertha celebrated his 264th aradhana. As a part of the celebrations, guru pooja, morning worship, sahasranama chanting, vedic renditions and tarangam singing were conducted. Bhajan troupes from various parts of the State rendered tarangams with devotion.

Specially residents and devotees of Varagur village (Thirukkattupalli, Tanjore) celebrate Tharangini Mahotsav every year on 25 & 26 January, all popular artists are performing Tharangam in front of Lord Venkateswara Perumal who has given Darshan to Sri Narayana Theerthar. Later on Sri Narayana Theerthar, the composer of Krishna Leela Tharangini, attained mukti at Varagur. The devotees of Thirupoonthuruti have been organising music festivals at the Samadhi shrine for over 300 years, at Tirupoonthuruti on Masi Sukla Ashtami Day.

References

Details of Sri Narayana Teertha in pdf format.
Narayana Teertha, Galaxy of Composers
Narayanateertha at Sangeetasudha.org with his Tarangams in English.
Homage to Sri Narayana Tirtha
Saint who underlined the power of Namasiddhanta

Carnatic composers
Telugu people
1650 births
1745 deaths
Indian male composers
17th-century Indian composers
18th-century Indian composers
Musicians from Andhra Pradesh
People from Guntur district
17th-century male musicians